Willwerscheid is an Ortsgemeinde – a municipality belonging to a Verbandsgemeinde, a kind of collective municipality – in the Bernkastel-Wittlich district in Rhineland-Palatinate, Germany.

Geography 

The municipality belongs to the Trier Region and lies about 8 km northeast of Wittlich in the Vulkaneifel. The municipal area is 62% wooded. Willwerscheid belongs to the Verbandsgemeinde of Traben-Trarbach.

History 
Beginning in 1794, Willwerscheid lay under French rule. In 1814 it was assigned to the Kingdom of Prussia at the Congress of Vienna. Since 1947, it has been part of the then newly founded state of Rhineland-Palatinate.

Politics 

The municipal council is made up of 6 members, elected by majority vote at municipal elections, and the honorary mayor as chairman.

Economy and infrastructure 
Southwest of the municipality runs the Autobahn A 1. There is an interchange in nearby Hasborn. In Wittlich is a railway station on the Koblenz-Trier railway line.

References

External links 

 Municipality’s official webpage 

Bernkastel-Wittlich